Goth Kohelpur is a village development committee in Dhanusa District in the Janakpur Zone of south-eastern Nepal. At the time of the 1991 Nepal census it had a population of 3,019 persons living in 578 individual households.

References

External links
UN map of the municipalities of Dhanusa District

Populated places in Dhanusha District